Tjust was one of the small lands of Småland, Sweden. It was divided into the hundreds of Tjust Northern Hundred and Tjust Southern Hundred. It corresponds to Västervik Municipality and the southern part of Valdemarsvik Municipality.

Early attestations 
In his 500s Getica, Jordanes mentions a Scandinavian tribe theustes, possibly the inhabitants of Tjust. Tjust is also mentioned in the dative singular þiusti on the Södermanland runic inscription 40 from the 1000s. In the 1103 Florens list, it is also found in the Latin form Teuste.

References 

Småland